Timothy James "TJ" M. Dimacali, (born April 17, 1980) is a Filipino science fiction writer and a science journalist. He is the first Filipino and first Fulbright scholar to attend the Massachusetts Institute of Technology's Graduate Program in Science Writing. He is also a science education advocate.

As a journalist, Dimacali served as Science and Technology Editor for GMA News and Public Affairs’s online portal GMA News Online, which earned him recognition from the Philippines' Department of Science and Technology, which named him one of the awardees of the Gawad Scriba Award for Science Communicators in 2013.  He left the post after receiving a Fulbright scholarship to MIT in 2017.

Career

Literary writing 
In 2009 he was chosen to be a Fellow for English Fiction at the Iligan National Writers' Workshop, held at Mindanao State University – Iligan Institute of Technology in Iligan City.

In 2010 he also contributed the story "Keeper of My Sky" to Volume 5 of Philippine Speculative Fiction, which by then was being edited by Nikki Alfar and Vincent Simbulan.  In 2014, the same story was optioned Paolo Chikiamco's Mythology-oriented anthology  "Alternative Alamat: Stories Inspired by Philippine Mythology". In 2012, Dimacali was also selected as a Fellow for Fiction at the Silliman University National Writers Workshop, held at Silliman University in Dumaguete.

His work regularly graces the pages of anthologies such as Kestrel Publishing's Philippine Speculative Fiction series and Paolo Chikiamco's Alternative Alamat, as well as magazines such as Philippine Graphic and Summit Media's Kwentillion. His story “Sky Gypsies” has also been adapted into a comic book, with John Ray "JR" Bumanglag as artist, coming out in the pages of Kwentillion magazine.

GMA News Online  
When GMA News and Public Affairs launched its online presence in the form of GMA News Online in 2009, Dimacali became the portal's online community manager. In 2010, GMA News Online created the post of Science and Technology Editor, and asked Dimacali to come on board. Under Dimacali, GMA News Online became noted for its coverage of basic science stories–in contrast to most Philippine news venues, whose science and technology coverage has thus far either tended to focus on consumer technology, or relegated to special sections that only get published occasionally.

In July 2013, the Philippine Department of Science and Technology (DOST) awarded Dimacali with a DOST Gawad Scriba Award for Science Communicators.

Science education and consultancy work 
In 2020, Dimacali was tapped as a communications consultant for the Philippine Department of Science and Technology (DOST), and the Philippine National Academy of Science and Technology (NAST), and the Probe Media Foundation.

As part of their response to the various quarantines arising from the Coronavirus disease 2019 pandemic in the Philippines, the Philippines' Department of Science and Technology  tapped Dimacali as writer alongside Jeffrey Hidalgo as film director for their 20-minute "TuklaSiyensya sa Eskwela" Science education modules. These were designed to be used by both public and private schools who had to shift to teaching Science via distance mode while the COVID-19 crisis remained unresolved.

Dimacali also regularly contributes to Batobalani Magazine and Asian Scientist Magazine.

Controversy

Iligan Workshop incident 
In August 2019, a twitter user claimed that Dimacali had sexually assaulted a participant of the 2019 Iligan Writer's Workshop, in which Dimacali was a guest speaker.  A legal case filed by the participant was eventually dismissed with finality by Iligan City Assistant Prosecutor Shirly Parmisana-Bisnar in January 2020. In January 2022, police arrested a woman alleged to be the poster of the original accusatory tweet, charging her with cyber libel under the Cybercrime Prevention Act of 2012.

Following the twitter allegation in August 2019, the workshop participant detailed her recollection of the events in a statement released through social media, while Dimacali maintained his innocence through social media and through an affidavit he submitted to the Commission on Human Rights, containing his own recollection of events.
The participants then filed a case against Dimacali as investigations into the incident were launched by the Philippines' Commission on Human Rights, and by the Mindanao State University Iligan Institute of Technology (MSU-IIT) which was the host institution of the workshop.

In her January 2020 decision to dismiss the case, Iligan City assistant city prosecutor Shirly Parmisana-Bisnar noted that the sexual act “was voluntary on the part of the complainant, taking into consideration the manner and circumstances surrounding the incident." Parmisana-Bisnar also absolved Dimacali of sexual harassment because the respondent “did not demand, request nor require any sexual favor from the complainant,” pointing out that during a clarificatory hearing, the complainant "was asked whether she was forced, threatened or intimidated by the respondent to do such act and her answer was always in the negative." The investigation conducted by MSU-IIT also found the incident to be "a private matter between two consenting adults."

See also 
GMA News and Public Affairs
Howie Severino

References 

Living people
Filipino journalists
Filipino science journalists
Filipino online journalists
Filipino male short story writers
Filipino short story writers
Filipino speculative fiction writers
1980 births
Filipino writers
Writers from Metro Manila
Massachusetts Institute of Technology alumni
University of the Philippines Diliman alumni